Carolyn DeHoff (born November 7, 1967) is an American former college basketball coach. DeHoff is the former women's basketball coach for North Dakota State University.  DeHoff is a graduate of Arizona State University.

Career
University of Wyoming - asst. coach
Weber State University - asst. coach
University of Utah - asst. coach
North Dakota State University - former head coach
Roy High School (Roy, UT) - Head Coach (current)

External links
 Carolyn DeHoff profile at gobison.com

1967 births
Living people
American women's basketball coaches
American women's basketball players
Arizona State Sun Devils women's basketball players
Basketball coaches from Wyoming
Basketball players from Wyoming
High school basketball coaches in the United States
North Dakota State Bison women's basketball coaches
Sportspeople from Cheyenne, Wyoming
Weber State Wildcats women's basketball coaches